The 2013 IFA Shield was the 117th edition of the IFA Shield. The tournament this season was held from 4 March 2013 in West Bengal. This year also, the Indian Football Association announced that two foreign clubs would participate in the tournament, Costa Rican Primera División club Deportivo Saprissa and Bangladesh Premier League club Muktijoddha Sangsad. However on 4 March 2013 it was announced that Muktijoddha Sangsad would not participate in this tournament and instead current I-League club ONGC would take their place.

Prayag United won their maiden title by defeating East Bengal in the final.

Teams

Group stage

Group A

Group B

Semi-finals

Final

Goalscorers
6 Goals
  Odafe Onyeka Okolie (Mohun Bagan)

3 Goals
  Chinadorai Sabeeth (Mohun Bagan)
  Ranti Martins (Prayag United)
  Chidi Edeh (East Bengal)
  James Moga (Pune)
  Pablo Rodríguez (United Sikkim)

2 Goals
  Andrew Barisić (East Bengal)
  Carlos Hernández (Prayag United)
  Walter Centeno (Deportivo Saprissa B)
  Mohammed Rafique (Prayag United)
  Kayne Vincent (Prayag United)

1 Goal
  Boima Karpeh (Pune)
  Diego Chavez (Deportivo Saprissa B)
  Joel Montero (Deportivo Saprissa B)
  Jonathan Moya (Deportivo Saprissa B)
  Fanai Lalmuanpuia (ONGC)
  Jatin Singh (ONGC)
  Kailash Patil (ONGC)
  Manandeep Singh (East Bengal)
  Shaiju Mon (Pailan Arrows)
  Shankar Oraon (Prayag United)
  Subhash Singh (Pune)
  Zohmingliana Ralte (Pune)
  Katsumi Yusa (ONGC)

References

2013 domestic association football cups
IFA Shield seasons
IFA Shield